The Venerable (venerabilis in Latin) is a style, a title, or an epithet which is used in some Western Christian churches, or it is a translation of similar terms for clerics in Eastern Orthodoxy and monastics in Buddhism.

Christianity

Catholic

In the Catholic Church, after a deceased Catholic has been declared a Servant of God by a bishop and proposed for beatification by the Pope, such a servant of God may next be declared venerable ("heroic in virtue") during the investigation and process leading to possible canonization as a saint. A declaration that a person is venerable is not a pronouncement of their presence in Heaven. The pronouncement means it is considered likely that they are in heaven, but it is possible the person could still be in purgatory. Before one is considered venerable, one must be declared by a proclamation, approved by the Pope, to have lived a life that was "heroic in virtue" (the theological virtues of faith, hope, and charity and the cardinal virtues of prudence, justice, fortitude, and temperance). The next steps are beatification, which normally requires a miracle by the intercession of the candidate, from which point the person is referred to as "The Blessed". The blessed declaration implies the person is in Heaven, experiencing the beatific vision, but this is not a requirement. The canonization is consummated when the person intercedes in a miracle (normally, this is their second intercession) and is declared a saint. Exceptional canonizations exist. The declaration of sainthood is definitive only to the extent that the Catholic Church claims the person died in the state of grace and already enjoys beatific vision. For example, Popes Pius XII and John Paul II were both declared venerable by Pope Benedict XVI in December 2009, and John Paul II was declared a saint in 2014.

Other examples of venerables are Bishop Fulton J. Sheen, Princess Louise of France, Francis Libermann, and Mother Mary Potter.

The 7th/8th-century English monk St Bede was called venerable soon after his death and is still often called "the Venerable Bede" despite having been canonized in 1899.

This is also the honorific used for hermits of the Carthusian order in place of the usual term of "Reverend".

Anglican
In the Anglican Communion, "The Venerable" (abbreviated as "the Ven.") is the style usually given to an archdeacon.

Eastern Orthodoxy

In the Eastern Orthodox Church the term "Venerable" is commonly used as the English-language translation of the title given to monastic saints (Greek: hosios, Church Slavonic: prepodobni; both Greek and Church Slavonic forms are masculine).

A monastic saint who was martyred for the Orthodox faith is referred to as "Venerable Martyr" or hosiomartyr.

In the 20th century, some English-language Orthodox sources began to use the term "Venerable" to refer to a righteous person who was a candidate for glorification (canonization), most famously in the case of Saint John of Shanghai and San Francisco. This has not altered the original usage of the term in reference to monastic saints.

Buddhism
In Buddhist monasticism, various terms or titles for senior or highly respected monks may be translated as "Venerable", including in Theravada Buddhism Bhante and Mahanayaka (Burmese). In Tibetan Buddhism there is Rinpoche.

See also
 Lists of venerable people (disambiguation)
 Venerable Order of Saint John

References

External links 
 

Christian terminology
Ecclesiastical styles
Sainthood
Types of saints